Joseph Watson, 1st Baron Manton (10 February 1873 – 13 March 1922) was an English industrialist from Leeds, Yorkshire.

He was chairman of Joseph Watson & Sons Ltd, soap manufacturers of Leeds, and a director of the London and North-Western Railway, in the late 19th century the largest joint stock company in the world. He became in later life a pioneer of industrialised agriculture in England and a successful racehorse owner. He was step-great-grandfather to David Cameron, former Prime Minister of the United Kingdom.

Early life
Watson was the only son of George Watson, soap manufacturer, of Donisthorpe House near Moor Allerton, Leeds, Yorkshire. He was educated at Repton School and Clare College, Cambridge. He was recalled to the family firm before completing his degree, becoming chairman at a young age.

Soap business

Joseph Watson & Sons
Joseph went to work at his grandfather's company, Joseph Watson & Sons, and turned the company from the medium-sized concern built up by his father and uncle Charles into one which ruled the soap market of North-East England, with national and international sales, becoming William Lever's biggest rival.

Soap Trust monopoly

On 4 August 1906 Watson and William Lever, by then the largest manufacturer, met in the Grand Hotel in London to finalise a plan to set up a "Soap Trust" which would merge the major soap manufacturers into a monopoly, thereby gaining economies of scale in advertising and production costs. Watson favoured the use of a parent company whilst Lever preferred a scheme of exchange of shares between participating companies to bind them together. This occurred during a period of many corporate trusts in the United States. The scheme was strongly opposed by the Daily Mail newspaper which campaigned for a boycott by its readers of the trust brands. Profits at participating firms were thereby severely reduced. The Northcliffe Press in its expanding and highly popular campaign overstepped the mark by falsely asserting trust soaps were made from scented fish oil. Although Watson and Lever won substantial libel damages from the press, losses in reputation and profits had been suffered all round. On the proposal of Watson and Crosfield, another large manufacturer, the scheme was abandoned in November 1906. By then Watson had already disposed of much of his shareholding, previously all held by himself and his uncle Charles, to William Lever, in exchange for Lever Brothers shares to set up the trust.

Lever Brothers and Jurgens
 
In 1912/13 Watson sold much of his remaining shareholding to Lever (Lever Brothers Ltd., later Unilever) and sold to him the remainder in July 1917, but remained as chairman. In July 1915 he had sold to Lever his half share in the Planter's Margarine Co Ltd, a joint venture established in November 1914 at Godley in Cheshire with Levers, in response to Government anxiety at the wartime loss of Dutch supplies, which by 1915 was the country's second largest margarine manufacturer. He had supplied it from his Olympia Oil & Cake Co. Ltd. at Selby, Yorks which operated the largest linseed oil crushing and refining plant in Europe. It also hardened whale oil and in 1917 during WWI was allocated by the government 21% (later 25%) of British whale oil for hardening. Watson then suffered substantial losses in an unsuccessful speculation in linseed, and he sold Olympia Oil & Cake to the Dutch firm Jurgens, which had outbid Levers.

Pioneer of industrialised agriculture
Spurred on by wartime food shortages, Watson began pioneering industrialised agriculture, and he funded an "Agricultural Research Department" on his estate at Offchurch near Leamington Spa in Warwickshire.

His Olympia Oil & Cake Co. under the brand name "OCO" produced animal feed for dairy cows, calves, lambs and pigs, all from the new source of linseed oil. The company acquired sites near Selby within the parish of Barlby in 1909–10, and their buildings later dominated the road and river frontages. Soon after 1910 the company built the first "village estate" of workers' housing in the area, which was later expanded by other nearby employers. Before 1921 the Olympia Hotel opened near the site at Barlby Bank, taking its name from the company and using a sign showing seed-crushing machinery. The company in 1952 became part of British Oil and Cake Mills Ltd.

Following Manton's death his executors claimed he had put £1 million into agriculture and received £750,000 from sales of the properties.

A 1921report by the U.S. Department of Agriculture reported:
The Olympia Agricultural Company, Ltd., is a British syndicate which has purchased agricultural estates aggregating 20,000 acres in the counties of Yorkshire, Northamptonshire, Cambridgeshire, Suffolk, Warwickshire, and Wiltshire. A research department has recently been organized under the direction of Dr. Charles Crowther, professor of agricultural chemistry in the University of Leeds and director of the institute for research in animal nutrition in that university. ... The headquarters of the department have been located on the company's estate of about 2,700 acres at Offchurch, near Leamington, in Warwickshire, where the ancient mansion of Offchurch Bury is being adapted to provide the necessary laboratories and other improvements which are now approaching completion. ... It is stated that liberal financial provision for the research department has been made by the company."

Wartime munitions work

At the start of the First World War, Watson's industrial and organisational expertise was used to assist the government in the establishment and operation of national munitions factories, most notably at the First National Shell Filling Factory at Barnbow, Leeds.

Following the heavy consumption of munitions in the opening battles of WWI at the Somme, the Northcliffe Press (Daily Mail) brought to the public's attention what became known as "The Shell Crisis", signifying that the nation had given little thought to securing long-term munitions supplies needed to successfully wage an unprecedented protracted war. The Asquith government fell, to be replaced by that of Lloyd George, recently appointed Minister of Munitions to resolve the crisis. Watson, as chairman of a six-man "Leeds Munitions Committee" made up from local industrialists in August 1915, was charged by the government to immediately establish the first of 12 National Shell Filling Factories. A factory was promptly established on a  greenfield site at Barnbow, close to Leeds. It resembled a small town of detached houses and huts more than a traditional factory, to contain and localise any accidental explosions. It remained the largest such operation in the country, having despatched 566,000 tons of finished ammunition overseas by the Armistice. At its height it employed 16,000 workers, 93% of whom were women and girls. Its fire brigade responded to three accidental explosions, the most serious of which occurred in 1916, killing 35 women and injuring many more.

Racehorse owner

Watson hunted with the Bramham Moor foxhounds in Yorkshire, near his home at Linton Spring, Wetherby. He was a prominent racehorse owner and in 1918 acquired from Alec Taylor, Jr. the famous Manton training establishment near Marlborough in Wiltshire, going on to spend £30,000 on yearlings. In 1921 he won The Oaks with Love in Idleness, and the Grand Prix de Paris, the world's richest racing prize (400,000 Francs), with Lemonora which also had gained third place in the Derby that year, all ridden by jockey Joe Childs. He was termed by the racing press Mr "Lucky" Watson.

Philanthropy

In 1921 Watson donated £50,000 to the Leeds General Infirmary, of which he was a board member from 1906 to his death. The monies were used to replace some of its investments which had to be sold during WWI. A half-length bronze bas-relief portrait of Watson in his baronial robes is displayed there in the George Street entrance hall, under which is inscribed A Wise Counsellor and Generous Benefactor.

Elevation to the peerage 

On 25 January 1922 he was raised to the peerage for his war services as Baron Manton of Compton Verney in the County of Warwick. He had purchased the Robert Adam neo-classical mansion Compton Verney and its  estate in 1921 from Lord Willoughby de Broke, intending to make his seat there, which intention was not realised due to his sudden death in March 1922, before having taken up residence. Whether his elevation, at the behest of Lloyd-George, was the result of a political donation, has not been proved but the title is not amongst those generally quoted by commentators as falling into this category.

Armorials

Joseph Watson adopted, or was allocated by the heralds, a variation of the armorials of the Watson Earls of Rockingham, which earldom had become extinct in 1746 on the death of Thomas Watson, 3rd Earl of Rockingham. The arms of Baron Manton became :"Argent, on a chevron azure between 4 martlets 3 in-chief and 1 in-base sable a crescent between 2 roses of the field". For supporters he also adopted a variant of Rockingham: "On either side a gryphon per fesse azure and argent, charged on the shoulder with a rose also argent". The arms of the Earls of Rockingham were: "Argent, on a chevron azure between 3 martlets sable as many crescents or". The Rockingham supporters were: "2 griffins argent ducally gorged or". Manton adopted the Rockingham motto without alteration: "Mea Gloria Fides" (Trust is my Renown). For his crest, Manton adopted a variant of the oak tree arms of the 17th-century Watson family of Saughton, Edinburgh: crest of Baron Manton: "a gryphon passant sable in front of an oak tree proper". The armourials of Watson of Saughton were: "Argent, an oak tree growing out of a mount in base proper surmounted of a fess azure". The latter family was granted in 1818 the griffin supporters of the Earls of Rockingham, noted above.

Marriage and progeny

In 1898 Joseph Watson married (Frances) Claire Nickols (d.1944), 3rd daughter of Harold Nickols (1848–1925), of Sandford House, Kirkstall, Leeds, proprietor of "Joppa Tannery", 87 Kirkstall Road, Leeds. Joppa Tannery was built in 1828 by Harold's father Richard Nickols as an expansion from the small tannery he had established in Bramley in 1823. The Joppa Tannery employed 300–400 people at its height and produced "upper leather" for shoes. It closed briefly but was re-openrd by Harold Nickols in 1900 under the name "Harold Nickols Ltd". It continued to be run by Harold's son Richard III Nickols, and closed in 1955. Watson had four sons by Claire Nickols:

(George) Miles Watson, 2nd Baron Manton (1899–1968), who after a brief military career, with his younger brother Robert continued his father's race-horse breeding programme, as a director of "Newmarket Bloodstock Ltd."
Robert Fraser Watson (1900–1975), ("Bobbie") with his eldest brother a director of "Newmarket Bloodstock Ltd." Destined for the army he attended Wellington College and Sandhurst and Trinity College, Cambridge, where he was Master of the Cambridge University Draghounds. His military career was cut short by  tuberculosis and to recuperate he moved to Kenya Colony, where he became a member of the Happy Valley set. In March 1927 he became engaged to Beryl Clutterbuck (later Beryl Markham), the Colony's "Golden Girl", a racehorse trainer and later a pioneer aviator who became the first woman to fly across the Atlantic from east to west. The engagement was cancelled only 5 months later when she became engaged instead to Mansfield Markham, which change "produced a great deal of amused speculation within the (Kenya) Colony, whose chief occupation and innocent delight was social gossip". Markham did not long retain her affections as in 1929 she commenced a very public affair with Prince Henry, Duke of Gloucester, son of King George V. "A generally held opinion was that Watson had a lucky escape". Watson himself had an interest in flying and in 1935 acquired an Avro 643 Cadet Mk.II bi-plane, sold in 1937 to the Spanish Republican Air Force. Watson later served as deputy-chairman of the Hospitals for the Diseases of the Chest, today the Royal Brompton Hospital in London. His racehorse Dick Turpin won the 1933 Chester Cup, ridden by Gordon Richards. In 1943 he sold his Dorset estate including Peggs Farm, Vale Farm and Manor Farm in the parishes of Sutton Waldron and Iwerne Minster to Lord Beaverbrook. In December 1948 at Newmarket he sold his 7-year-old brood mare Ferry Pool for 18,000 guineas, a record price in England. He was step-grandfather to David Cameron, former Prime Minister of the United Kingdom, having married in 1961 (as his 2nd wife) Enid Levita (d.1995) (a lineal descendant of King William IV by his mistress Dorothea Jordan) formerly wife of Ewen Donald Cameron, and grandmother of David Cameron. 
Alastair Joseph Watson (1901–1955), whose share of his paternal inheritance included the remnant of the Sudbourne Estate in Suffolk, 7,650 acres of which were advertised for sale as "the late Lord Manton's Suffolk estate" in the Times newspaper of 31 March 1922, in order to pay death duties. The 1,200 acre Chillesford Lodge Estate, the estate's Victorian "model farm" built in 1875 by Sir Richard Wallace, 1st Baronet of Sudbourne Hall, the noted art collector and illegitimate son of the 4th Marquess of Hertford, where the Red Poll breed of cattle had been developed in the 19th century, is retained in 2015 by his descendants. The famous "Sudbourne" prefixed herds of Red Poll cattle and the famous "Sudbourne" stud of Suffolk Punch heavy horses, were retained by Watson and won several prizes. In 1936 he built the Chillesford Polo Ground, a private club open to family and friends where teams played by invitation only. It represented "country polo at its best" and used an advanced system of irrigation sprinklers, then unique in England, imported by Watson from the USA where he had seen them in use at the Santa Barbara Polo Club in California. Spectators were encouraged and were admitted free of charge, with printed programmes with colour covers provided, a further innovation for a small polo club at the time. The club closed during World War II but re-opened in 1948. He was trampled by ponies during a polo match, which led to his death some months later. After this the polo ground was ploughed up.
(Richard) Mark Watson (1906–1979), a diplomat who served as attaché at the British Embassy in Washington DC (1930–1932) and in Paris (1932–1934). In 1965 he was decorated with the Icelandic Order of the Falcon. Unmarried.

Death and burial

He died in March 1922, aged only 49, from a heart-attack, whilst out hunting beside two of his sons. They were with the Warwickshire Foxhounds, at Upper Quinton, close to his new mansion. He died having held his title for less than two months. He was buried at his nearby manor of Offchurch, in his hunting apparel. His estate was sworn for probate at exactly one million pounds. A portrait of Joseph Watson mounted on a hunter was painted by Lynwood Palmer, together with a painting by the same artist of his racehorse Love-in-Idleness.

Notes

References

Further reading 
 David J. Jeremy (editor). (1984). Dictionary of Business Biography. Butterworths. 5: part 2. pp. 690–2.
 Charles Kidd, David Williamson (editors). (1990).Debrett's Peerage and Baronetage. New York: St Martin's Press. 
 "Obituary: Joseph Watson," The Times, 14 March 1922.

 McKie, David, Soap Opera or Suds Law?, The Guardian newspaper, 15 April 2004

External links

 Leodis: A photographic archive of Leeds – photo of Joseph Watson & Sons Ltd Whitehall Road factory circa 1918
Grace's Guide: British industrial history – Joseph Watson & Sons Ltd.
Grace's Guide: British industrial history – Olympia Oil & Cake Co.
 Daily Telegraph Obituary of 3rd Baron Manton
 Compton Verney House website

1873 births
1922 deaths
Unilever people
Businesspeople from Leeds
English industrialists
English agriculturalists
English philanthropists
British racehorse owners and breeders
Barons in the Peerage of the United Kingdom
Deaths by horse-riding accident in England
Barons created by George V